This is an incomplete list of areas of land under community ownership in Scotland. It includes areas purchased in community buyouts, as well as land gifted or transferred for a nominal fee.

The Land Reform (Scotland) Act 2003 introduced rights for communities to purchase land in their area. Funding for buying land has been provided by the Scottish Government through the Scottish Land Fund.

References

 
Highland Estates
Scotland geography-related lists
Scotland politics-related lists